Cryptophlebia pallifimbriana is a moth of the family Tortricidae. It was described by John David Bradley in 1953. It is found on Fiji, the Austral Islands, the Cook Islands, the Marquesas Islands, New Guinea, the New Hebrides and the Society Islands. It has also been recorded from the Australian state of Queensland.

The wingspan is about 24 mm.

The larvae bore the fruits of Inocarpus fagifer and Inocarpus edulis.

References

 Cryptophlebia pallifimbriata in Cook Islands Biodiversity Database

Grapholitini
Moths of Oceania
Moths described in 1953